This is a list of historic counties of England by area according to the Arrowsmith map of 1815-6, which was in turn generated from the work of the Ordnance Survey.

References

Area in 1815